Cochylis indica is a species of moth of the family Tortricidae. It is found in Pakistan.

References

Moths described in 1968
Cochylis